Daniel K. Davis (born September 6, 1941) is an American politician who is the U.S. representative from , elected in 1996. The district serves much of western Chicago, including the Loop. It also includes several of Chicago's inner western suburbs, such as Bellwood, Oak Park, and River Forest. Davis is a Democrat, a member of the Congressional Black Caucus, and a former member of the Democratic Socialists of America (DSA).

Early life, education, and career
Davis was born in Parkdale, Arkansas, and educated at Arkansas Agricultural, Mechanical and Normal College (now the University of Arkansas at Pine Bluff; B.A. in history, 1961), Chicago State University (M.S. in guidance, 1968), and the Union Institute & University in Cincinnati, Ohio (Ph.D. in public administration, 1977).

Davis worked as a government clerk, a high school teacher, executive director of the Greater Lawndale Conservation Commission, director of training at the Martin L. King Neighborhood Health Center, and executive director of the Westside Health Center before entering politics. He represented Chicago's 29th Ward on the Chicago City Council from 1979 to 1990.

Davis challenged U.S. Representative Cardiss Collins in Democratic primaries in 1984 and 1986, but lost both races. In 1990, he unsuccessfully challenged incumbent Edward J. Rosewell for the Democratic nomination for Cook County Treasurer. Also in 1990, Davis was elected to the Cook County Board of Commissioners, serving from 1990 to 1996 before entering the House. Davis had also waged an unsuccessful campaign against Chicago Mayor Richard M. Daley in the 1991 Democratic mayoral primary.

Cook County Board of Commissioners
Davis was elected to the Cook County Board of Commissioners from Chicago at-large in 1990. When the board transitioned to district elections in 1994, he was elected to its 1st district.

Entering Congress in 1997, Davis left the Cook County Board of Commissioners. He desired to see Illinois State Senator Earlean Collins appointed his successor on the board, but party leaders instead chose Darlena Williams-Burnett, executive assistant of Jesse White and the wife of alderman Walter Burnett Jr. Collins challenged and unseated Williams-Burnett in the Democratic primary for the seat in 1998.

U.S. House of Representatives

Elections 

On December 6, 1995, Davis announced his candidacy for the 7th congressional district, adding his name to the already announced Democratic candidates, including Alderman Percy Z. Giles, Cook County Board of Commissioners member Bobbie L. Steele, Alderman Ed Smith, and Alderman Dorothy Tillman. Five other Democratic candidates entered the race later: S. Mendenhall, Joan Sullivan, G. Winbush, Anthony Travis, and Joan Powell, making it the largest field of candidates for U.S. Congress in Illinois in 1996. Davis lived a block outside the district, but was familiar in it.

Davis ran on a progressive Democratic platform popular in the district. He was pro-choice and supported gay rights, the ERA, single-payer health care, and some federal support for child nutrition and care.

In early January 1996, the FBI revealed its Operation Silver Shovel, which included an investigation into Alderman Giles. What Operation Silver Shovel may have done to undermine Giles's chances for election are unclear as he was already lagging with a mere 3% among likely Democratic primary voters in a mid-December poll compared to Davis's 33%, Smith's 8%, Tillman's 7%, and Steele's 6%. But Giles did have Mayor Richard M. Daley's support and that of other well-known area figures—some of whom continued their support during the controversy.

On March 10, 1996, during a radio debate hosted by WMAQ-AM, Tillman and Smith called for Davis to reject the endorsement of former alderman candidate Wallace "Gator" Bradley, spokesman for convicted Gangster Disciples leader Larry Hoover. "Why do you keep badgering me with this question?" Davis replied. "You got a problem with something? You're not going to catch me going around saying I hate Gator Bradley. … I'm not in the business of disavowing individuals. The good Lord said he hated sin, but not sinners. I'm not hating Gator Bradley. I disagree with those who commit crime and those who'd use drugs, but you won't catch me going around saying that I hate Gator Bradley." Davis never rejected Bradley’s endorsement during the campaign, and after winning the primary claimed that Bradley’s endorsement played no role in the outcome, though Bradley asserted the contrary.

During the campaign, Tillman highlighted comments Davis made in an August 1970 issue of Ebony: "[T]he white female often gives the black man certain kinds of recognition that the black woman often does not give him." The Davis campaign countered that Davis was speaking as a psychologist in his role as a training director at a health center.

Although Davis was fully promoted as a Democratic candidate, he also ran as a New Party candidate. Supporting this was New Party’s celebration of him as the "first New Party member elected to the U.S. Congress." Although the State of Illinois did not permit fusion voting, New Party advocated it as a means to promote itself and its agenda and to project New Party ideology into the Democratic Party. Candidates were called "N[ew]P[arty] Democrats" and required to sign a contract mandating a "visible and active relationship" with New Party. During this time, New Party was experiencing substantial growth. Davis was also endorsed by the Chicago Democratic Socialists of America (CDSA), of which he had been a member since before his congressional run. ACORN, AFL–CIO, Sierra Club, and the International Brotherhood of Teamsters also endorsed Davis.

In the March 20 Democratic primary, Davis received more votes than the two closest candidates, Tillman and Smith, combined. The first five announced candidates all received more than twice as many votes as the five late-entering candidates, with none of the latter receiving more than 2,700.

In the November 5 general election, Davis defeated Republican Randy Borow and third-party candidates Chauncey L. Stroud (Independent), Toietta Dixon (Libertarian), and Charles A. Winter (Natural Law) with over 82% of the vote.

Tenure 
Davis expressed interest in replacing John Stroger on the ballot in the 2006 race for President of the Cook County Board. Stroger's son Todd Stroger was ultimately selected.

In late 2008, Davis expressed interest in being President Barack Obama's replacement in the U.S. Senate before Illinois Governor Rod Blagojevich's scandal erupted. In a December 31, 2008, New York Times article, Davis said that he turned down an offer from Blagojevich's representatives to appoint him to the Senate. Instead, Blagojevich appointed Roland Burris.

Davis ran for mayor of Chicago a second time in 2011, but withdrew before the election and endorsed Carol Moseley Braun.

In the 2020 Democratic Party presidential primaries, Davis endorsed Kamala Harris. He later endorsed Joe Biden ahead of the Iowa caucus.

Sun Myung Moon
In 2004, Davis was met with national controversy when he crowned Reverend Sun Myung Moon in a religious ceremony at the Dirksen Senate Office Building honoring Moon. Moon declared himself the Messiah at the crowning ceremony, in which Davis appeared on the invitation as a sponsoring co-chair. Davis wore white gloves and carried the crown on a pillow to crown Moon and his wife "the King and Queen of Peace." Davis told Christian Challenge that Moon's declaring himself the Messiah "was similar to a baseball team owner telling team members that 'we are the greatest team on earth'" before a game. Davis said the peace awards were to "recognize people for promoting peace. Of course the highest recognition goes to the highest promoter and the highest promoter is Reverend Moon, so they come up with something higher than the certificates and plaques that other folks get." Other lawmakers who attended included Senator Mark Dayton, Representatives Roscoe Bartlett and Elijah Cummings, and former Representative Walter Fauntroy. Key organizers of the event included George Augustus Stallings, Jr., a controversial former Catholic priest who had been married by Moon, and Michael Jenkins, the president of the Unification Church of the United States at that time.

Trip paid for by Tamil Tigers
As the 15th most prolific traveler in Congress, Davis stirred up controversy by accepting a trip to Sri Lanka in 2005 on behalf of the Tamil minority there, paid for by the Tamil Tigers, a group that the U.S. government has designated as a terrorist organization for its use of suicide bombers and child soldiers. Davis said that he was unaware that the Tigers were the source of the trip's funding.

Relationship with Louis Farrakhan
Davis has said that Louis Farrakhan, the leader of the Nation of Islam who has attracted considerable controversy for his anti-Semitic and homophobic remarks, is an "outstanding human being" and that "I personally know him, I’ve been to his home, done meetings, participated in events with him." In March 2018, Davis said: "The world is so much bigger than Farrakhan and the Jewish question and his position on that and so forth. For those heavy into it, that’s their thing, but it ain’t my thing." Davis condemned Farrakhan's views later that month, saying, "So let me be clear: I reject, condemn and oppose Minister Farrakhan’s views and remarks regarding the Jewish people and the Jewish religion." He attended Farrakhan's Million Man March and was the only member of Congress to address the 20th anniversary of it.

Committee assignments
 Committee on Oversight and Reform
Subcommittee on Civil Rights and Civil Liberties
Subcommittee on Government Operations
 Committee on Ways and Means
Subcommittee on Worker and Family Support (Chair)
Subcommittee on Trade

Party leadership and caucus membership
 Chair of the Congressional Postal Caucus
 Regional Whip
 Congressional Arts Caucus
Medicare for All Caucus

Electoral history

Personal life 
 Davis is married to Vera G. Davis. They have two children. Davis is a member of Alpha Phi Alpha fraternity. He is notable for his support of the National Federation of the Blind. He spoke at their 2004 and 2005 conventions.

On November 18, 2016, Davis's 15-year-old grandson Javon Wilson was murdered while trying to break up a fight during a home invasion in Chicago's Englewood neighborhood.

On March 30, 2017, Davis's 44-year-old son Stacey Wilson was found dead in his home. He was Javon Wilson's father.

See also
 List of African-American United States representatives

References

Further reading
 BuzzFlash Interview: Congressman Danny Davis April 2001

External links

 Congressman Danny K. Davis official U.S. House website
 Danny K. Davis for Congress 
 

 

|-

1941 births
Living people
21st-century American politicians
African-American members of the United States House of Representatives
African-American people in Illinois politics
Baptists from Arkansas
Chicago City Council members
Democratic Party members of the United States House of Representatives from Illinois
Members of the Cook County Board of Commissioners
Democratic Socialists of America politicians from Illinois
People from Ashley County, Arkansas
Politicians from Chicago
21st-century African-American politicians
20th-century African-American people